The Day After Tomorrow is a 2004 apocalyptic science-fiction film.

The Day After Tomorrow may also refer to:

Literature
 The Day After Tomorrow (novel), a novel by Allan Folsom
 Sixth Column or The Day After Tomorrow, a 1949 novel by Robert Heinlein

Music
 Day After Tomorrow (band), a J-Pop band
 Day After Tomorrow (Day After Tomorrow album), 2002
 Day After Tomorrow (Joan Baez album), 2008
 The Day After Tomorrow (Maino album), 2012
 "The Day After Tomorrow", a 2010 song by David Archuleta from The Other Side of Down
 "The Day After Tomorrow", a 2002 song by Saybia from The Second You Sleep
 "The Day After Tomorrow", a 1995 song by Take That from Nobody Else
 "Day After Tomorrow", a 2004 song by Tom Waits from Real Gone

Film and television
 Day After Tomorrow (film), a 1968 Italian Spaghetti Western film
 "The Day After Tomorrow" (The O.C.), an episode of The O.C.
 The Day After Tomorrow (TV special), a 1975 television pilot

See also
 The Day After (disambiguation)
 A Day Before Tomorrow, a 2006 Nightwish concert film